Parliamentary elections were held in Croatia-Slavonia in December 1911. Despite efforts of Ban Nikola Tomašić to coerce voters to vote for pro-government parties, the result was unfavourable as the government won only 21 seats. Elections in 4 districts were suspended and in 1 district the results were challenged. On the last day of the elections Josip Frank, former leader of the Starčević's Party of Rights, died in Zagreb.

Results

References

Croatia
1911 in Croatia
Elections in Croatia
Elections in Austria-Hungary
December 1911 events
Kingdom of Croatia-Slavonia
Election and referendum articles with incomplete results